WKIO (107.9 FM, "Classic Hits 107.9") is a commercial radio station broadcasting a classic hits format. Licensed to Arcola, Illinois, the station is owned by The News-Gazette, and serves the Champaign-Urbana metropolitan area.  On weekday mornings, WKIO carries the syndicated "Bob & Tom Show" from WFBQ Indianapolis.

History
On , the station signed on the air.  The original call sign was WZNX.  It changed its call sign to WKJR on November 1, 1994. On May 5, 1997, the station again changed its call sign to WXET before finally changing them to WUIL on May 7, 2008, upon its switch to a rhythmic contemporary format from hot adult contemporary.

Pendleton Broadcasting inked a LMA deal with owner Champaign Partners to operate Top 40/Rhythmic WUIL (107.9 JAMZ).  The long-term deal started May 1, 2009 and carries an option to buy the station from Champaign Partners for $1.5 million.

In June 2010, WUIL was sold to the News-Gazette, which also owns WDWS and WHMS. The station relaunched as "U-Rock 107.9", playing various rock formats. The switch was made with station General Manager Mike Haile's introduction of "Ladies and Gentlemen...rock and roll." The station had a popular contest where it allowsed listeners to submit and air their "Perfect Ten" rock songs. The station then played these selections on Thursdays.

In March 2013, WUIL applied to change its call sign to WKIO, signaling a format change.

On March 26, 2013, WUIL changed formats from rock to classic hits, branded as "Classic Hits 107.9" under the new WKIO call sign.

Former U-Rock air staff
 Orion Buckingham
 Dave Loane
 Brian Moline
 Mark Reynolds
 Lee Marcus
 Ethan VanDeveer
 Patti Good

References

External links

KIO
Radio stations established in 1991
Champaign County, Illinois
Douglas County, Illinois